Koh-Lanta: Pacifique was the fifth season of the French version of Survivor Koh-Lanta. This season was held in New Caledonia on the Isle of Pines. It was broadcast on TF1 from Tuesday July 5, 2005 to Tuesday August 31, 2004. The two tribes original tribes this season were Kanawa and Kumo. Episode one of this saw the first ever double tribal council to occur in the history of Koh-Lanta. The reason for this was because it was discovered that the Kumo tribe had all openly discussed who would be leaving at the first tribal council. Due to the voluntary exit of Aude, a joker, Caroline entered the game in episode two. This also caused the re-entrance of Francis into the competition.

The winner of this season of Koh-lanta was Clémence Castel, who took home the prize of €100,000.

Contestants

Future appearances
Clémence Castel returned for Koh-Lanta: Le Retour des Héros. Coumba Baradji and Mohamed Derradji returned for Koh-Lanta: Le Choc des Héros. Baradji later returned alongside Francis Bordas for Koh-Lanta: La Revanche des Héros. Castel later returned for a third time for Koh-Lanta: Le Combat des Héros which she won. Castel and Baradji returned again for Koh-Lanta: La Légende.

Voting History

Controversy 

During the broadcast of the second episode (July 8, 2005 in France and July 10, 2005 in New Caledonia), participants had to kill and cook Puffinus pacificus, a species of fully protected bird in New Caledonia. This caused that several spectators demanded explanations to the TF1 channel. TF1 responded that according to the LPO (in English; League for the Protection of Birds), Puffinus pacificus are not a protected species. LPO asked the CSA (broadcasting regulator in France) to take up the case, and the latter also decided to initiate legal action against TF1 and the producer of the Adventure Line Productions program.

The petition against the production company was accepted, therefore TF1 was ordered to pay the LPO € 1,000 in damages and € 2,000 for procedural expenses, while the TF1 channel lawsuit against the LPO was rejected.

Notes

References

External links
(Official Site Archive)

05
2005 French television seasons
Television shows filmed in New Caledonia